Darkness in a Different Light is the eleventh studio album by progressive metal band Fates Warning, released in 2013 through Inside Out Music. It is the band's first album since FWX (2004), marking the longest gap between two studio albums in their career, as well as being their first studio album with guitarist Frank Aresti since Inside Out (1994); although he appeared on the band's next album Theories of Flight (2016), as a guest, Darkness in a Different Light would be the last to feature Aresti as an official member. Drummer Bobby Jarzombek also makes his debut with Fates Warning on this album, and it is the band's first release through Inside Out Music.

Background
Plans for an eleventh Fates Warning studio album were mentioned in September 2009 when vocalist Ray Alder said that the band was working on new material. In June 2011, guitarist and bandleader Jim Matheos hinted that Fates Warning would not be playing any more shows that year as the band was continuing to work on their new album.

In March 2012, Alder reaffirmed that the band was working "as hard as we can" to complete the album for a late 2012 or early 2013 release. On December 28, 2012, Matheos confirmed that the songwriting was complete. Three months later, it was announced that Fates Warning would enter the studio in April to record the album.

On August 1, 2013, the album title and release dates were announced. Alder described Darkness in a Different Light as "the result of almost two years of very hard work from everyone in the band" and celebrated the lineup as "the best that Fates Warning has ever had".  He expressed his eagerness to tour extensively in support of the album.  During October 2013, the band performed in nine European countries.

Alder suggested that awareness of the band's previous releases informed the new album: "The idea with Darkness in a Different Light was to do something similar to Parallels, not necessarily musically, but in theory. Catchy songs, big choruses—that was the idea. Sure, we sometimes think that we won't ever make an album as big as Parallels, but I think our new album is different than anything else out there right now. We look to the future".

With respect to the album title, Alder indicated that it was inspired, although accidentally, by Matheos' lyrics for the song "And Yet It Moves". Alder explained that

The track "O Chloroform" features lyrics by keyboardist Kevin Moore, which were originally left unused from the writing sessions for the 2011 Arch/Matheos album Sympathetic Resonance. Alder remarked of the song's lyrics and curious title: "It's such a cool song, ... I know what chloroform is, but I don't know what he's talking about [laughs]."

Reception

Reviews for Darkness in a Different Light have been mostly positive. Observing that instrumental technicality has become the norm in metal, AllMusic's Gregory Heaney lauded Fates Warning for bucking the trend and writing songs which "bring us back to a time when songs felt more like sprawling compositions than theoretical math problems". Describing it as "another notch in a long list of accomplishments for Fates Warning", Dan Drago praised the album in About.com for "flawlessly glid[ing] back and forth between complex progressive time signatures and straightforward crushing riffs". Blabbermouth's Ray Van Horn Jr. suggested a kinship between Darkness in a Different Light and Fates Warning's 1990s output, but also noted an "amplified toughness" that pointed to earlier works such as No Exit (1988). Joe Devita suggested in Loudwire that Darkness in a Different Light marked Fates Warning's "leap into the modern age" with the band "reinventing themselves while retaining pieces of their hallmark sound".

Around 2,700 copies were sold in its first week of release. This resulted in Darkness in a Different Light entering at 162 on the Billboard 200; the band's first album since Perfect Symmetry (1989) to appear on the chart.

Track listing

Personnel
Fates Warning
Ray Alder – lead vocals, production
Jim Matheos – guitar, engineering (vocals, guitar)
Frank Aresti – guitar, background vocals
Bobby Jarzombek – drums
Joey Vera – bass, engineering (bass)

Additional credits
Phil Magnotti – engineering (drums), mixing
Kent Smith – engineering, mixing (live tracks)
Maor Appelbaum – mastering
Conte di San Pietro – artwork, design

Release history

Chart performance

References

External links
Review by Nick at When Prog and Power Unite

Fates Warning albums
2013 albums
Inside Out Music albums